George Shannon (born c. 1940) is an American professor of gerontology at the USC Leonard Davis School of Gerontology, inaugural holder of the Kevin Xu Chair in Gerontology, and director of the Rongxiang Xu Regenerative Life Science Laboratory. He is also a former television and film actor, particularly known for his appearances in soap operas, including How to Survive a Marriage, Search for Tomorrow, Generations, and General Hospital. He played a leading role in the 1973 French surreal drama film I Will Walk Like a Crazy Horse.

In 1995, Shannon returned to college to pursue a Bachelor's, Master's, and PhD in gerontology after a nearly 30-year career in acting.

Career

Actor 
Shannon studied improvisational acting for two years at The Second City in Chicago and studied with Lee Strasberg in his private classes and at the Actors Studio for seven years. He has performed in over 50 plays, six films, and has had contract roles on five daytime series. He also served as a teacher of improvisation and theatre director in Los Angeles.

Professor 
Shannon currently teaches courses in Program Evaluation, Social Policy and Aging, and Society and Adult Development. His current research work is focused on Multicultural Aging and Creative Arts. He has authored or co-authored seven peer-reviewed articles professional journals. He is an active member of Phi Kappa Phi and the Sigma Phi Omega Gerontology Honor Society.

References

External links 
 Official website

Living people
American male actors
American gerontologists
University of Southern California faculty
Year of birth missing (living people)